Lou Ciccotelli is an American musician from Chicago who served as a drummer for multiple British bands, including God, Ice and Laika.

Biography
Lou Ciccotelli was a founding member of the noise rock group Drunk Tank, but parted with them after recording their two singles in 1989. The same year he briefly became a member of the industrial rock act Slab! shortly before they disbanded.

He later joined God, an industrial metal ensemble with free jazz leanings founded by British musician Kevin Martin. He recorded two studio albums with the band, Possession in 1992 and The Anatomy of Addiction in 1994, along with several live albums and EPs. He collaborated again with Martin on Bad Blood, an industrial hip hop project issued under the name Ice in 1998.

He began recording with the dream pop band Laika in 1994, first appearing on the EP Antenna and then on their full-length debut album Silver Apples of the Moon. He has since performed on all four of Laika's studio albums.

Discography

References
General

 
 

Notes

Living people
God (British band) members
Ice (band) members
Laika (band) members
Rock drummers
Year of birth missing (living people)